Anatoly Fyodorovich Krutikov (21 September 1933 – 8 November 2019) was a Russian footballer and manager.

Club career
Krutikov played in nearly 300 Soviet league matches for FC Spartak Moscow, winning the Soviet Top League in 1962 and the Soviet Cup in 1963 and 1965.

International career
He earned 9 caps for the USSR national football team, and participated in the first ever European Nations' Cup in 1960, where the Soviets were champions. He was selected for the 1964 European Nations' Cup squad, but did not play in any games at the tournament.

Coaching career
He has the dubious distinction of being the only FC Spartak Moscow coach to get the team relegated from the top division in USSR or Russia (in 1976).

On 8 November 2019, FC Spartak Moscow announced that Krutikov had died.

Honours
 Soviet Top League winner: 1962.
 Soviet Cup winner: 1963, 1965.

References

External links
 Profile (in Russian)

1933 births
2019 deaths
Russian footballers
Soviet footballers
Soviet football managers
Soviet Union international footballers
1960 European Nations' Cup players
UEFA European Championship-winning players
PFC CSKA Moscow players
FC Spartak Moscow players
Soviet Top League players
PFC Spartak Nalchik managers
FC Spartak Moscow managers
FC Shakhter Karagandy managers
People from Naro-Fominsky District
Russian expatriate sportspeople in Kazakhstan
Association football defenders
Sportspeople from Moscow Oblast